Cameron Highlanders may refer to:

 The people of the Cameron Highlands, a mountainous region in Malaysia

Military units

Great Britain/United Kingdom
 The Queen's Own Cameron Highlanders (1793–1961), former infantry regiment of the British Army
 The Queen's Own Highlanders (Seaforth and Camerons) (1961–1994), former infantry regiment in the Scottish Division of the British Army
 The Highlanders (Seaforth, Gordons and Camerons) (formed 2006), infantry battalion in the Scottish Division of the British Army

Canada
 The Cameron Highlanders of Ottawa (Duke of Edinburgh's Own), infantry regiment of the Canadian Forces
 The Queen's Own Cameron Highlanders of Canada, infantry regiment of the Canadian Forces, headquartered in Winnipeg

Military units and formations disambiguation pages